Vietnam Mobile Telecom Services One Member Limited Liability Company (with the brand MobiFone ) is a major Vietnamese mobile network operator headquartered in Trung Hoa Nhan Chinh, Hanoi. Founded on 16 April 1993, as a Global System for Mobile Communications launcher, MobiFone is the first and currently third largest telecommunications provider in Vietnam.

Market share and competitors
MobiFone had a market share (estimated based on revenues) of 17.9% in 2012.
Its main competitors are Viettel with 40.67% market share and Vinaphone with 30%, which is also owned by VNPT. Together, the big three control almost 90% of the market, with the rest controlled by Vietnamobile with 8%, Gmobile (formerly Beeline) with 3.2% and S-Fone with 0.1%.

History

2015
 Become the corporation under the Ministry of Information and communication called MobiFone Telecommunications Corporation.

2011
 Foundation of the Mobile Telecom Services Centre VI.0AA

2008
 Foundation of the Mobile Telecom Services Centre V.
 The Value Added Services Centre was founded.
 MobiFone ranked as the first position in the Vietnam’s mobile telephony subscription market share.

2006
 Foundation of the Mobile Telecom Services Centre IV.

2005
 Liquidated the business cooperation contract with Kinnevik/Comvik (Sweden).
 The State of Vietnam and Ministry of Posts and Telematics (now is Ministry of Information and Communications) decided to sell equity.
 Mr. Le Ngoc Minh became director after the retirement of Mr. Dinh Van Phuoc.

1995
 Committed a business cooperation contract with Kinnevik/Comvik (Sweden).
 Foundation of the Mobile Telecom Services Centre III.

1994
 Foundation of the Mobile Telecom Services Centre I & II.

1993
 Foundation of Vietnam Mobile Telecom Services Company.
 Director is Mr Dinh Van Phuoc.

References

External links
 
 Mobifone thử nghiệm 4G tại Đà Nẵng, Hà Nội và Hồ Chí Minh
 Mobifone triển khai các gói 3G mới từ ngày 10/5/2016

Mobile phone companies of Vietnam
Vietnamese brands
Telecommunications companies established in 1993
Companies based in Hanoi